Oliver Martini (born 12 December 1971, Bologna) is an Italian racing driver. He has competed in such series as International Formula 3000, Euroseries 3000 and the EFDA Nations Cup. He won the Italian Formula Three Championship in 1997 for RC Motorsport.

Their uncle, Giancarlo, was also a racing driver.

References

External links
 Career statistics from Driver Database

1971 births
Living people
Italian racing drivers
Sportspeople from Bologna
Italian Formula Three Championship drivers
International Formula 3000 drivers
Auto GP drivers
EFDA Nations Cup drivers

Team Astromega drivers
RC Motorsport drivers
Draco Racing drivers